Stephany Karina Zreik Torres (born December 25, 1995) is a Venezuelan model, lawyer and beauty pageant titleholder who was crowned Miss Earth Venezuela 2020 and Miss Earth - Air in the Miss Earth 2020 pageant. Stephany made history as the first Venezuela representative to win the Miss Earth Air 2020 elemental crown.

References

External links

1995 births
Living people
Miss Earth 2020 contestants
Venezuelan beauty pageant winners
People from Maracaibo